Tooma Dam is a major ungated earthen embankment dam across the Tooma River in the Snowy Mountains of New South Wales, Australia. The dam's main purpose is for the generation of hydro-power and is one of the sixteen major dams that comprise the Snowy Mountains Scheme, a vast hydroelectricity and irrigation complex constructed in south-east Australia between 1949 and 1974 and now run by Snowy Hydro.

The impounded reservoir is called the Tooma Reservoir.

Location and features
The dam was constructed by Societe Dumez based on engineering plans developed under contract by the Snowy Mountains Hydroelectric Authority. Construction of the dam did not flood any towns or villages as it did in at Talbingo

At 100% capacity the dam wall holds back  of water. The spillway is capable of discharging .

Recreation
Tooma Reservoir is a popular alpine fishing location; and holds both Brown and Rainbow trout. Camping is permitted in the Clover Flat Camping area. Campers are encouraged to carry their own water supplies.

See also

 List of dams and reservoirs in New South Wales
 Snowy Hydro Limited
 Snowy Mountains Scheme

References

External links
 

Snowy Mountains Scheme
Embankment dams
Hydroelectric power stations in New South Wales
Dams in New South Wales
Dams completed in 1961
Dams in the Murray River basin